The Women's Volleyball Thailand League is the highest level of Thailand club volleyball in the 2014–15 season and the 10th edition.

Teams
 Ayutthaya A.T.C.C
 Bangkok
 Bangkok Glass
 Idea Khonkaen
 Nakhonnont 3BB
 Nakhon Ratchasima
 Sisaket
 Supreme Chonburi

Regular season

Ranking

|}

Round 1

|}

Round 2

|}

Final standing

Awards

External links
 2014-15 Volleyball Thailand League

2014
Thailand League 
Volleyball,Thailand League
Thailand League 
Volleyball,Thailand League